Galeodes arabs, common name Egyptian giant solpugid or camel spider, is a species of solifuges (or sun spiders) native to North Africa and Western Asia.

Subspecies
 Galeodes arabs arabs — Carl Ludwig Koch, 1842 
 Galeodes arabs syriacus — Karl Kraepelin, 1899

Description
They have large, powerful jaws, reaching one-third of their body length. They are nocturnal. They can reach a speed of 10 miles per hour (16 km/h). They are not venomous, but their bite is painful.

Diet
They eat insects, small rodents and lizards. Using their chelicerae, they can chop and saw their victim’s flesh. Their jaws are equipped to shear hair and quills from their prey as well as cut through skin and the thin bones of small birds. They then utilise digestive juices to liquefy the flesh of their prey so they can suck it into their bodies.

Predators
Some of their predators are large slit-faced bats, scorpions, toads and other insectivores or camel spiders. They are heliophobic and nocturnal in order to avoid predators, have better hunting and stay out of the hot sun.

References

Solifugae
Arthropods of North Africa
Arthropods of Egypt
Arthropods of Israel
Arthropods of Syria
Animals described in 1842
Taxa named by Carl Ludwig Koch